Big Brother Slovenija is the Slovenian version of the international reality television franchise Big Brother created by producer John de Mol in 1997. The show was originally broadcast on Kanal A in 2007, 2008, 2015 and 2016. A celebrity season was aired in 2010 on POP TV. The show followed a number of contestants, known as housemates, who are isolated from the outside world for an extended period of time in a custom built house and trying to avoid being evicted by the public with the aim of winning a large cash prize at the end of the run.

Series details

Regular season

Celebrity season

The house

2007-2010 
A 550 square meter Big Brother house is situated in the backyard of Pro Plus building in Ljubljana.
There's 300 m2 dwelling, and 250 m2 for the garden. House's every corner is covered by 22 cameras.
Bathroom, toilets, and showers which cannot be locked for security reasons, are also covered by cameras.
Essential kitchenware can be found in the kitchen along with sink, electric cooker, oven, refrigerator, and a silverware container.
Housemates can eat self-cooked meals at a big 12-chair dining table in the dining room.
Comfortable divans are found in the living room which can be used in free time.
Big Brother house features two four-bedded bedrooms, two of which are double. Every housemate receives one bedding set, which they have to wash and make themselves. Even here every movement and whisper is recorded by cameras.
Housemates are frequently called into confessional, where they share their experiences with Big Brother. A person may enter confessional only when the empty and green light is lit above it. A chair and table can be found inside.
Very important part of the Big Brother house is a depository, where much-earned food and accessories for various tasks are dropped off. The depository is except on Saturdays and Sundays open only one hour a day, possible break-ins are prevented by the electric lock.

2015 
Big Brother Slovenija 2015 was filmed in Serbia, where the regional version of Big Brother — Veliki Brat is filmed. The house is located in Belgrade, in the urban neighborhood of Kosutnjak. The house was built in 2006 for the Serbian Big Brother. The house consists of a confessional, a bedroom, a living room, a kitchen, a dining room, a bathroom, a pantry, a garden and an extra space called Elite section, used throughout the season as a secret room. The house also has a swimming pool.

2016 
Big Brother Slovenija was back in Slovenia, however, it's not located next to the Pro Plus building, but in Vevče near the tennis courts.

Broadcasting

Regular seasons

Celebrity season

References

Slovenia
2007 Slovenian television series debuts
2008 Slovenian television series endings
2000s Slovenian television series
Slovenian reality television series
Pop (Slovenian TV channel) original programming